Nikolaos Palentzas (born ) is a Greek male volleyball player. He is part of the Greece men's national volleyball team. On the club level he plays for Iraklis Thessaloniki V.C.

References

External links
 profile at FIVB.org

1991 births
Living people
Greek men's volleyball players
Volleyball players from Thessaloniki
Iraklis V.C. players
PAOK V.C. players
Aris V.C. players